Rasmus Tveteraas (28 December 1862 – 10 June 1938) was a Norwegian schoolteacher, school inspector and politician. 

He was son of farmer Ole Johannesen Tveteraas and Kari Larsdatter Rongved, and was the father of printmaker Vilhelm Tveteraas and librarian Harald L. Tveterås. 

Tveteraas was assigned schoolteacher in the municipality of Høgsfjord, and later teacher, headmaster and eventually school inspector in Stavanger. He was a supplant to the Stortinget from 1922–1924 and 1925–1927, and elected representative from 1928 to 1930.

References

1862 births
1938 deaths
Norwegian educators
Politicians from Stavanger
Liberal Party (Norway) politicians
Members of the Storting